The Gladstone House is a hotel in Toronto, Ontario, Canada. It was built in 1889 and named after Gladstone Avenue, next to the hotel. The Parkdale area hotel was designed by local architect George Martell Miller in the Romanesque Revival style. The Gladstone House is one of the oldest  hotel buildings still operating as a hotel in Toronto. Since renovations in the early 2000s, the hotel has become an arts hub in the West Queen West neighbourhood of Toronto.

In June 1973, the City of Toronto assigned a Part IV historical designation to the property.

Architecture
The hotel was designed by George Martell Miller, the architect of the Lillian Massey building of the University of Toronto, many other public buildings in the city, as well as a large number of grand residential buildings in the Parkdale neighbourhood.

The hotel was designed in the Richardsonian Romanesque style - in the period a popular style for public buildings such as train depots, churches, and libraries. The architectural style of the Gladstone is characterized by the rough cut stone and brick and by the dramatic arches over the windows and porch entrances. The hotel tower is also characteristic of the style. The cupola was removed in the 1940s due to disrepair.

The Gladstone retains its original plaster mouldings in the grand hallways. In the hotel's Melody Bar, the two restored pillars' faux marble finish was rendered in true European fresco technique. No other architectural pillars such as these exist in Toronto. The meticulously restored Victorian (1903) elevator is one of the last hand-operated elevators in Toronto. Zeidler Partnership and Eb Zeidler were the architects for the restoration of the hotel.

History
The hotel was built in 1889, across Queen Street from the then-existing Parkdale railroad station which serviced the Grand Trunk, the Canadian Pacific Railway (CPR), and the Canadian National Railway (CNR) companies. In addition to serving the three major railway companies, it also provided visitors attending the Canadian National Exhibition (CNE) a place to stay. The original owner, Susanna Robinson, was a widow who operated and lived at the hotel with her 13 children. Her husband, Nixon Robinson, a brewer, died during the construction of the hotel.

The Gladstone was named for Gladstone Avenue, which was named after British prime minister William Ewart Gladstone. The hotel's monthly newsletter, the Gladstone Bag, is named for the suitcase style, also named for William Gladstone. The Gladstone was one of the first ten hotels in Ontario to receive permission to allow patrons to drink and play shuffleboard in a licensed alcoholic area. At one time, the Gladstone Hotel was the last place to obtain hard liquor before reaching Hamilton.

A report appeared in the Toronto Star on October 3, 1911, indicating that the Gladstone was soon to become the property of an incorporated company.  The owner at that time was Mr Victor E. Gianelli. Interviewed by the Star, Mr Gianelli stated that the deal had not yet been closed, but the plan was to increase the size of the hotel and improve the facilities. In 1912, the Gladstone Hotel Company, of which Mr Thomas Slattery was the manager, purchased the Gladstone Hotel property from Mr Gianelli for $110,000. Mr Slattery had earlier purchased the license for $60,000.  It was reported that extensive alterations were to be made to the property.

Throughout the years the hotel was passed from owner to owner and gradually deteriorated in status. In the 1950s, the hotel was updated. with metal sheathing and glass block. The hotel was purchased by the Appelby family in 1964, and the family restored the exterior in 1989. The hotel's bar was named "Bronco's" and was a venue for live country and western music. In 1992, artist Walt Rushton, who lived in the hotel, painted a mural of historic methods of transportation in Canada as a Toronto 200-year anniversary project on the Gladstone Avenue windows of the hotel. The son of boxer George Chuvalo was found dead at the hotel in the mid-1990s of a heroin overdose.

Bronco's became the "Art Bar" jazz venue. In December 2001, the hotel was put up for sale for $3.3 million. On February 20, 2002, co-owner Michael Tippin served immediate eviction notices on the tenants, citing a lack of insurance on the building, however, a last-minute reprieve by Margaret Zeidler let the tenants stay after the hotel closed. The next day, the Zeidlers announced that they had found insurance for the hotel, allowing it to remain open. The Zeidlers became sole owners of the hotel in 2003 and the venue began to host art shows, openings and community meetings as well as live music.

In 2004, the Zeidlers began a restoration of the hotel, which was completed in 2005. Eberhard Zeidler was the architect involved and two of his daughters, Margie and Christina, oversaw operations and management. Margaret Zeidler, who was involved in the restoration of 401 Richmond Street West, had originally bought the hotel and made arrangements to have her sister manage the hotel. The owners invited local artists to compete in a competition for new designs for hotel rooms, each with a main concept or idea. The renovation reduced the number of rooms to 37, each one-of-a-kind, from the winning proposals. The Gladstone kept its bar and event venue spaces open and operating throughout the restoration process.

The long-term tenants were moved out of the hotel in June 2004, when it became clear that the hotel needed extensive refurbishing and the hotel's third and fourth floors (the hotel room floors) required three months of closure. The Zeidlers helped them find new homes in the community prior to beginning the restoration project. The family provided financial support and the employees at the hotel worked to find homes for the most elderly and at risk. Some of the former residents moved to the Parkview Arms Hotel, down Queen Street beside Trinity Bellwoods Park. The story of the tenants' leaving is documented in the Last Call At The Gladstone Hotel documentary.

In 2004, the Gladstone began hosting Come Up To My Room, an alternative design exhibition showcasing new and established local art/design talent, co-founded and co-curated by Christina Zeidler and Pamila Matharu. It is run annually as part of the Toronto Design Offsite Festival, during Toronto Design Week.

Last Call at the Gladstone Hotel
A documentary film, Last Call at the Gladstone Hotel, was created by Last Call Productions as a portrait of the effects of urban renewal on the poor, as the Gladstone was being converted from a skid row flophouse to arts and music hotspot.  It was shot over a span of five years, showing that the developers' plan for a gradual restoration with staff and residents remaining upstairs, while downstairs the bar served designer drinks to new, affluent clientele didn't work. City inspectors demanded a complete rewiring, the boiler blew up leaving the hotel without heat, ceilings leaked, walls crumbled and management had to cope with this reality.

Sale to developers
In early March 2020, an announcement was made that the property had been sold to developers Streetcar Developments and Dream Unlimited, who have experience with "character projects". The buyers issued statements indicating that the building would be restored. The hotel has had a heritage designation from the City of Toronto since June 1973.

See also
 Drake Hotel (Toronto)

References

External links

 City of Toronto historical plaque, and hotel photo
 Emporis Building site - The Gladstone Hotel (photos, minor profile)

Hotel buildings completed in 1889
Hotels established in 1889
Hotels in Toronto
Romanesque Revival architecture in Canada
1889 establishments in Ontario